"As If" is a song co-written and recorded by American country music artist Sara Evans.  It was released in June 2007 as the first single from her Greatest Hits compilation album. The song became Evans' twelfth Top 20 hit on the US Billboard Hot Country Songs chart, with a peak at number 11. Evans wrote this song with Hillary Lindsey and John Shanks.

Content
"As If" is a moderate up-tempo song co-written by Sara Evans with Hillary Lindsey and John Shanks, backed primarily with percussion and electric guitar. The narrator describes being in love, hoping that no matter what, the feelings she shares for her man will never fade. In the end they eventually do, but she's acting "as if" they will not.

Critical reception
Kevin J. Coyne of Country Universe gave the song an A rating. "It’s no surprise to me that it’s a charming record, perfectly produced and expertly sung.  And, as usual, it’s just offbeat enough to be genuinely different from anything else on the radio."

Music video
A music video was released for the song, directed by Roman White. The video shows Evans in a store, shopping for the perfect man, which she then takes home to live with her. She is then shown performing the song while her new men do the house work in the background. Evans ends up going through three men before finding that the right guy for her is the UPS man (who delivers each of her men to her house) she has seen all along.

The video was ranked #23 on the 2008 version of CMT's 40 Sexiest Videos.

Chart performance
"As If" debuted at number 52 on the U.S. Billboard Hot Country Songs chart in June 2007.

Year-end charts

References

2007 singles
2007 songs
Sara Evans songs
Songs written by Hillary Lindsey
Music videos directed by Roman White
Songs written by John Shanks
Songs written by Sara Evans
RCA Records singles
Song recordings produced by Mark Bright (record producer)